National Route 302 is a national highway of Japan connecting Nakagawa-ku, Nagoya and Nakagawa-ku, Nagoya in Japan, with a total length of 54 km (33.55 mi). Route 302 serves as Nagoya's inner loop and runs concurrent with much of the Mei-Nikan Expressway.

References

National highways in Japan
Ring roads in Japan
Roads in Aichi Prefecture